Agauta or Agota is a town and a Gram panchayat in Bulandshahr district in the state of Uttar Pradesh, India. This town is 300 years old and was once a Rajya Sabha Seat.
It belongs to Meerut Division. It is located 18 km towards north from district headquarters Bulandshahr. 11 km from Gulaothi. 416 km from state capital Lucknow. Agauta is famous for the Agauta Sugar & Chemicals.

Agota's Pin code is 245411 and postal head office is Gulaothi (Bulandshahr). Agota is a very safe & peaceful place for living. Outsider people are welcome for the investment in Land & Factory. People of this town are supporting to each other. Crime of this town is zero percent.

Kisoli (2 km), Nimchana (2 km), Pavsara (3 km), Bubupur (3 km), Bagwala (3 km) are the nearby villages to Agota. Agota is surrounded by Gulaothi Tehsil towards the west, Bhawan Bahadur Nagar Tehsil towards the north, Bulandshahr Tehsil towards the south, and Syana Tehsil towards the east .

External links
 Location on Google Maps

Cities and towns in Bulandshahr district